David Dempster Fraser (born 9 April 1943) is a Scottish former first-class cricketer.

Fraser was born in April 1943 at Duddingston, Midlothian. He was educated at the Royal High School, Edinburgh. A club cricketer for Royal High School Former Pupils, Fraser made his debut in first-class cricket for Scotland against the Marylebone Cricket Club at Glasgow in 1967. He made three further first-class appearances for Scotland, against Warwickshire at Edgbaston on their 1967 tour of England, followed by appearances against Ireland in 1968 and the touring New Zealanders in 1969. Considered one of the best opening bowlers in Scotland, he took 8 wickets with his fast-medium bowling at an average of 45.37, with best figures of 3 for 29. Outside of cricket, he was an accountant by profession.

References

External links
 

1943 births
Living people
People from Edinburgh
People educated at the Royal High School, Edinburgh
Scottish cricketers
Scottish accountants